Victory Sports Complex is a  multi-purpose arena, in Loves Park, Illinois, just outside the city of Rockford.

Opening in 2007, the VSC became home to the Rockford Victory in 2008, when the team announced that it would be playing in the Ultimate Soccer League. Then in 2011, the Continental Indoor Football League's Chicago Knights, moved to VSC due to a conflicts with the Odeum Expo Center. For the 2012–13 season, the complex was home to the Rockford Rampage of the Professional Arena Soccer League.

References

External links
 

American football venues in Illinois
Buildings and structures in Winnebago County, Illinois
Indoor soccer venues in Illinois
Sports venues in Rockford, Illinois
Sports venues completed in 2007
2007 establishments in Illinois